This is a list of members of the third parliament of the South Australian House of Assembly, which sat from 27 February 1863 until 25 January 1865. The members were elected at the November 1862 colonial election.

 Barossa MHA Joseph Barritt resigned on 1 March 1864. John Williams won the resulting by-election on 8 June.
 Seat of The Murray subsumed in Mount Barker 1863; Allan McFarlane MHA died on 11 March 1864. William Rogers won the resulting by-election on 8 June.
 East Adelaide MHA William Bakewell resigned on 27 October 1864. Thomas Reynolds won the resulting by-election on 5 November.

Members of South Australian parliaments by term
19th-century Australian politicians